The Fort Wayne Open was a professional golf tournament on the Ben Hogan Tour that was played in Fort Wayne, Indiana from 1990 to 1992. It was played at Orchard Ridge Country Club in 1990 and 1991, and at Brookwood Country Club in 1992.

In 1990, Steve Brodie hit the first double eagle in any Ben Hogan Tour event, which was also the only double eagle on that Tour that year. In 1992, the winner earned $25,000.

Winners

See also
History of sports in Fort Wayne, Indiana

References

Former Korn Ferry Tour events
Golf in Indiana
Sports in Fort Wayne, Indiana
Recurring sporting events established in 1990
Recurring sporting events disestablished in 1992
1990 establishments in Indiana
1992 disestablishments in Indiana